is a Japanese actress and singer. She is represented by the agency Horipro. She won the award for Best Actress at the Yokohama Film Festival for Kamikaze Girls.

Biography 
Fukada was born and raised in Tokyo, Japan. In 20 October 1996, she won the 21st Talent Scout Caravan Grand Prix Award as part of the "Pure Girl Audition" at the age of 13. She began her career as an actress in 1997 with her first appearance in the television series Sore ga Kotae da! as Kazune Mizuno. Fukada appeared in her first movie Ring 2 as Kanae Sawaguchi in 1999 and in later in School Day of the Dead, released in 2000. She graduated from Horikoshi High School in 2001.

In 2002, she made an appearance in Dolls as Haruna. Fukada is also a J-pop singer and her debut single "The Last Fruit" led to her album "Dear…", both released by Pony Canyon in 1999.

Filmography

Films

Television

Japanese dub

Discography

Singles

Albums

Awards and nominations 
 Japan Academy Prize
 Japan Academy Prize for Best Newcomer in Shisha no Gakuensai (2000)
 nominated – Japan Academy Prize for Outstanding Performance by an Actress in a Leading Role in Shisha no Gakuensai (2000)
 Blue Ribbon Awards
 Blue Ribbon Awards for Best Supporting Actress in Yatterman (2009)
 Mainichi Film Awards
 Mainichi Film Award for Best Actress in Kamikaze Girls (2004)
 Tokyo Sports Film Awards
 Tokyo Sports Film Award for Best Actress in Kamikaze Girls (2004)
 Tokyo Sports Film Award for Best Supporting Actress in Yatterman (2009)
 Miscellaneous awards
 Golden Arrow Award for Most Promising Actress in Shinjuku Shōnen Tanteidan (1998)
 Élan d'or for Most Promising Actress in Kamisama, Mō Sukoshi Dake (1998)
 The Television Academy Award for Best Supporting Actress in Kamisama, Mō Sukoshi Dake (1998)
 The Television Academy Award for Best Supporting Actress in To Heart: Koishite Shinitai (1999)
 Nikkan Sports Film Award for Best Newcomer in "Shisha no Gakuensai" (2000)
 The Television Academy Award for Best Dresser in Fighting Girl (2001)
 The Television Academy Award for Best Dresser in Remote (2001)
 Yokohama Film Festival for Best Actress in Kamikaze Girls (2004)
 Yubari International Fantastic Film Festival for Max Factor Beauty Spirit (2005)
 The Television Academy Award for Best Actress in Hajimete Koi wo Shita Hi ni Yomu Hanashi (2019)

References

External links 

 Kyoko Fukada's official Profile at Horipro, Inc.
 
 
 Kyoko Fukada - Instagram

1982 births
Living people
Japanese voice actresses
Actresses from Tokyo
Singers from Tokyo
Japanese gravure idols
Japanese female idols
Japanese women pop singers
Japanese film actresses
Japanese television actresses
20th-century Japanese actresses
21st-century Japanese actresses
20th-century Japanese women singers
20th-century Japanese singers
21st-century Japanese women singers
21st-century Japanese singers
Horipro artists
Pony Canyon artists
Horikoshi High School alumni